Miss Nagaland is a state beauty pageant held annually since 1989 in the Northeastern Indian state of Nagaland. Miss Nagaland does not officially send any of its winners or previous contestants to participate in other beauty pageants. Nevertheless, a number of its beauty queens have over the years gone on to compete independently in other beauty pageants at the regional and national levels, as well as internationally.

Miss Nagaland is not affiliated with Femina which has since 2017 introduced a new format for the selection of contestants for the Femina Miss India national beauty pageant. Femina holds a separate audition to crown a Femina Miss India Nagaland winner to represent the state of Nagaland at Femina Miss India.

The reigning Miss Nagaland is Hikali Achümi.

History 
The first Miss Nagaland competition took place in 1989. Since 1991, the Beauty & Aesthetics Society of Nagaland has been organizing the beauty pageant.

Titleholders

Miss Nagaland 2021 
Following a hiatus in 2020 when Miss Nagaland could not take place owing to the COVID-19 pandemic, the 32nd edition of the pageant was held on 20 December 2021 at the Regional Centre of Excellence for Music & Performing Arts, Jotsoma, Kohima. Kawimaningsiliu Mharoni Khüvüng from Peren was crowned the winner at the end of the event.

The Miss Nagaland 2021 pageant marked the continuing 30th anniversary celebrations of the Beauty and Aesthetics Society of Nagaland.

Final results

Sub-title awards

Miss Nagaland 2019 
The 31st edition of the Miss Nagaland pageant was held on 9 December 2019 in Jotsoma, Kohima. Vikuonuo Sachü from Kohima was crowned the winner at the end of the event.

Final results

Sub-title awards

Miss Nagaland 2018 
The 30th edition of the Miss Nagaland pageant was held on 9 December 2018 at Jotsoma, Kohima. Mewetsho-ü Dianu from Phek was crowned the winner at the end of the event.

Final results

Sub-title awards

Miss Nagaland 2017 
The 29th edition of the Miss Nagaland pageant was held on 8 December 2017 at Jotsoma, Kohima. 12 contestants competed for the title. Marina Kiho from Dimapur was crowned the winner at the end of the event.

The photo-shoot of the contestants was directed by Ketholeno Kense Vihienuo, Indian supermodel from Nagaland and a recipient of the Vogue India and Colours Infinity Young Achiever of the Year award at Vogue Women of the Year 2017.

Final results

Sub-title awards

Miss Nagaland 2016 
The 28th edition of the Miss Nagaland pageant was held on 8 December 2016 at Jotsoma, Kohima. 14 contestants vied for the title which was ultimately won by Vilokali Zhimomi of Dimapur.

The Beauty and Aesthetics Society of Nagaland held its 25 years celebrations to coincide with the 2016 edition of the pageant.

Final results

Sub-title awards

Miss Nagaland 2015 
The 27th edition of the Miss Nagaland pageant was held on 9 December 2015 at Jotsoma, Kohima, where Nenghoilhing Hangsing was crowned the winner at the end of the event.

Final results

Sub-title awards

Miss Nagaland 2014 
The 26th edition of the Miss Nagaland pageant was held on 7 November 2014 at Jotsoma, Kohima, where Veineinem Singsong of Dimapur was crowned the winner at the end of the event.

Final results

Sub-title awards

Miss Nagaland 2013 
The 25th edition of the Miss Nagaland pageant was held on 8 December 2013 at the capital of Nagaland, Kohima, Kohima. 18 contestants vied for the title. Benjongmenla Jamir was crowned the winner by the previous year's winner Imlibenla Jamir.

Final results

Miss Nagaland 2012 
The 24th edition of the Miss Nagaland pageant was held on 6 December 2012 at the state capital Kohima. Imlibenla Jamir of Mokokchung bested 18 other contestants to win the crown.

Final results

Sub-title awards

Miss Nagaland 2011 
The 23rd edition of the Miss Nagaland pageant was held on 6 December 2011 at the state capital Kohima. 15 contestants competed for the crown, which was won by Vetolü Dawhuo of Phek.

Final results

Sub-title awards

Miss Nagaland 2010 
The 22nd edition of the Miss Nagaland pageant was held in December 2010 at the state capital Kohima, where Hattinneng Hangsing of Peren was declared the winner at the end of the event.

Final results

Sub-title awards

Miss Nagaland 2009

Miss Nagaland 2008 
The 20th edition of the Miss Nagaland pageant was held in December 2008 at the state capital Kohima. 13 contestants vied for the title which was won by Abin Kuki.

Final results

Sub-title awards

Miss Nagaland 2007

Miss Nagaland 2006

Miss Nagaland 2005

Miss Nagaland 2004

Miss Nagaland 2003

Miss Nagaland 2002

Miss Nagaland 2001

Miss Nagaland 2000

Miss Nagaland 1999

Miss Nagaland 1998

Miss Nagaland 1997

Miss Nagaland 1996

Miss Nagaland 1995

Miss Nagaland 1994

Miss Nagaland 1993

Miss Nagaland 1992

Miss Nagaland 1991

Miss Nagaland 1990

Miss Nagaland 1989

See also 
 Miss India
 Femina Miss India

References

External links 

Beauty pageants in India